Heinrich "Gaudi" Krafft (13 August 1914 – 14 December 1942) was a Luftwaffe ace and recipient of the Knight's Cross of the Iron Cross during World War II.  The Knight's Cross of the Iron Cross was awarded to recognise extreme battlefield bravery or successful military leadership. During his career he was credited with 78 aerial victories, 4 over the Western Front and 74 over the Eastern Front.

On 1 June 1942, Krafft succeeded Hauptmann Josef Fözö as Gruppenkommandeur (group commander) of I. Gruppe of JG 51.

Awards
 Iron Cross (1939) 2nd and 1st Class
 German Cross in Gold (25 January 1942)
 Knight's Cross of the Iron Cross on 18 March 1942 as Oberleutnant of the Reserves and Staffelkapitän of the 3./Jagdgeschwader 51 "Mölders"

Notes

References

Citations

Bibliography

 
 
 

1914 births
1942 deaths
People from Bílina
Luftwaffe pilots
German World War II flying aces
Recipients of the Gold German Cross
Recipients of the Knight's Cross of the Iron Cross
Luftwaffe personnel killed in World War II
Sudeten German people
Naturalized citizens of Germany